Lasha Lomidze (born 30 June 1992) is a Georgian rugby union player. His position is number 8, and he currently plays for London Irish in the English Premiership and the Georgia national team.

Biography 
Lasha Lomidze was formed in Montpellier. He made no appearances for the first team during his time at the club, but he was a part of Montpellier's Under-23 side that became the champion de France Espoirs in May 2013. During the summer of 2014, he signed for AS Béziers Hérault.

Lasha Lomidze was in the Georgian squad for 2015 Rugby World Cup.

On 1 June 2017, he signed for English Premiership club London Irish.

References

1992 births
Living people
Rugby union players from Georgia (country)
Expatriate rugby union players in France
Georgia international rugby union players
Expatriate sportspeople from Georgia (country) in France
Montpellier Hérault Rugby players
London Irish players
Rugby union number eights